Mohan Bhandari (31 July 1937 – 24 September 2015) was an Indian actor who featured in several popular TV serials such as Saat Phere: Saloni Ka Safar. He died of brain tumor. His son Dhruv Bhandari is also a TV actor.

Acting career 
Mohan Bhandari has been a part of hit TV shows like Khandaan, Chunauti, Mujrim Hazir, Parampara, Abhimaan, Babul Ki Duwayen Leti Jaa, Kittie Party, Saat Phere: Saloni Ka Safar. He was one of the busiest TV actors during the 1980s to 1990s. However, after that, he was completely out from the TV industry until 2005, where he was again noticed in a popular Zee TV show Saat Phere: Saloni Ka Safar, in which he played Narpat Singh, the father of the female protagonist, Saloni Singh. He also appeared in Baa Bahoo Aur Baby as Mr. Raichura, Leela's father and in Rakt Sambandh as Purushottam Jagirdar.

Early life
He worked for The State Bank of India.

Filmography

Television

References

External links

Indian male television actors
1937 births
2015 deaths